The Acid House is a 1998 Scottish film adaptation of Irvine Welsh's short story collection The Acid House directed by Paul McGuigan. Welsh himself wrote the screenplay, and appears as a minor character in the film.

Plot

The film dramatises three stories from the book:

 "The Granton Star Cause": A comedy, in which Boab (Stephen McCole) is having a rotten day. His parents throw him out so they can indulge in sado-masochism and he is sacked from his job, dumped by his girlfriend, and dropped from his football team. It has elements of Franz Kafka's The Metamorphosis. One of the characters is a pitiless, profane God who transforms him into a fly as punishment for wasting his life. Named after an Edinburgh housing district, "The Granton Star Cause" was filmed on location in Muirhouse and Pilton, including Ferry Road Drive.
 "A Soft Touch": Kevin McKidd plays Johnny, a man who is cuckolded by Larry (Garry McCormack), the ruthless upstairs neighbour who steals his electricity and his wife (Michelle Gomez). Filmed on location in Niddrie.
 "The Acid House": An acid trip and a bolt of lightning result in amiable schemie Coco Brice (Ewen Bremner) exchanging bodies with the baby of a middle-class couple (Martin Clunes and Jemma Redgrave).

All three sections are independent, but are linked by setting and the reappearance of incidental characters, in particular Maurice Roëves who appears variously as an inebriated wedding guest, a figure in a dream, and a pub patron. All three of his parts symbolise a human manifestation of God.

The film offended elements of the UK tabloid press with a depiction of a cynical, jaded, foul-mouthed God. In some English-speaking countries such as Canada and the United States it has been screened with subtitles because of the Scots vernacular and heavy Edinburgh accents.

Cast
"The Granton Star Cause"
Maurice Roëves – God
Stephen McCole – Boab
Garry Sweeney – Kev
Jenny McCrindle – Evelyn
Simon Weir – Tambo
Iain Andrew – Grant
Irvine Welsh – Parkie
Pat Stanton – Barman
Alex Howden – Boab Snr
Annie Louise Ross – Doreen (as Ann Louise Ross)
Dennis O'Connor – PC Cochrane
John Gardner – Sgt. Morrison
William Blair – Workmate
Gary McCormack – Workmate
Malcolm Shields – Workmate
Stewart Preston – Rafferty
Callum Stewart - boy playing football
"A Soft Touch"
Maurice Roëves – Drunk
Kevin McKidd – Johnny
Michelle Gomez – Catriona
Tam Dean Burn – Alec
Scott Imrie – Pool Player
Niall Greig Fulton – Alan
Cas Harkins – Skanko
Morgan Simpson – Chantal, Baby
Marnie Kidd – Chantal, Toddler
Alison Peebles – Mother
Joanne Riley – New Girl
Katie Echlin – Wendy
William 'Giggs' McGuigan – Pub Singer
William Blair – Deck
Gary McCormack – Larry
"The Acid House"
Maurice Roëves – Priest
Ewen Bremner – Colin 'Coco' Bryce
Martin Clunes – Rory
Jemma Redgrave – Jenny
Arlene Cockburn – Kirsty
actor – Emma
Doug Eadie – Coco's Father
Andrea McKenna – Coco's Mother
Cas Harkins – Skanko
Billy McElhaney – Felix the Paramedic
Ricky Callan – Tam the Driver
Barbara Rafferty – Dr. Callaghan
Stephen Docherty – Nurse Boyd
Ronnie McCann – Andy

References

External links
 
 

1998 films
1990s black comedy films
1990s fantasy comedy-drama films
Body swapping in films
British black comedy films
British fantasy comedy-drama films
1990s English-language films
English-language Scottish films
Films about babies
Films about dysfunctional families
Films about sexuality
Films based on short fiction
Films directed by Paul McGuigan
Films set in Edinburgh
Film4 Productions films
Films shot in Edinburgh
Films about God
Films with screenplays by Irvine Welsh
Granton, Edinburgh
Scots-language films

1998 directorial debut films
1998 comedy films
1990s British films